Carl-Fredrik Michelet Tidemann (12 April 1932 – 21 January 2017) was a Norwegian physician and military officer.

He was born in Oslo, and was a surgeon in the Norwegian Army from 1975. Tidemann was promoted Major General and head of the Norwegian Army Medical Service (Forsvarets sanitet) from 1984 to 1992. He later chaired the Norwegian Red Cross' Hospital in Oslo.

References

1932 births
2017 deaths
Physicians from Oslo
Norwegian surgeons
Norwegian military doctors
Norwegian Army generals
Military personnel from Oslo